Second officer may refer to:

Second officer (aviation), a civilian aviation rank
Second officer or Second mate, a merchant marine rank
Second officer, a rank in the Women's Royal Naval Service
Second officer, a rank in the Air Transport Auxiliary